Erin Routliffe and Aldila Sutjiadi defeated Nicole Melichar-Martinez and Ellen Perez in the final, 6–4, 3–6, [10–8] to win the doubles tennis title at the 2023 ATX Open.

This was the first edition of the tournament.

Seeds

Draw

Draw

References

External links 
 Main draw

2023 WTA Tour